The Dance Brigade are a ska band from London. Founded by Keith Finch (JA13, Crown of Thorns) and Lee "Kix" Thompson (Madness) in late summer 2007, they were soon joined by Jennie Matthias (The Belle Stars). The other musicians came from projects they had been involved in.

Their ska-based music is a hybrid of styles mixed in with technology; a 'Global Pillage' of sounds, reflecting the multi-cultural and global heritage of the band members.

Their live show at the 100 club was a clash of new generation ska and visuals, with live videos running concurrently to the music, which featured computers and a live band on stage. They were joined onstage by various guests from the reggae world including Dave Barker (Dave and Ansell Collins) who has recorded a track with them. After the show, various members have gone their separate ways, with their own bands but an album has been recorded and is soon to be released as at 2017.

Lee Thompson and Keith Finch have also written together tracks on the Madness albums Oui Oui Si Si Ja Ja Da Da deluxe edition, and Can't Touch Us Now.

Band members
 Lee Thompson - saxophone, vocals
 Jennie Matthias - lead vocals
 Keith Finch - production and programming
 Chico Chagas - keyboards, guitar, accordion
 Chalky White - trumpet
 Daniel Burdett - guitar, backing vocals
 Debra Barker - backing vocals

References

External links
 Official Dance Brigade Myspace

English ska musical groups
Musical groups established in 2007
Musical groups from London